Zita Pataki (born 1 November, 1973 in Gyöngyös) is a Hungarian television presenter, best known as the host of Class FM and is a meteorological news reporter on RTL Klub.

References

Hungarian television personalities
Living people
1973 births
People from Gyöngyös
Weather presenters